The chairman of the National Committee of the Chinese People's Political Consultative Conference is the leader of the National Committee of the Chinese People's Political Consultative Conference (CPPCC), which is a political advisory body in the People's Republic of China.

The chairman is officially nominated within the CPPCC National Committee and approved by a plenary session of the National Committee. The chairman is a member of the Standing Committee of the National Committee, which handles the regular of the body, and presides over its work. The chairman is also a member of the Chairperson's Council, which handles the day-to-day affairs of the Standing Committee. The chairman is assisted in their work by vice chairpersons and the secretary-general of the National Committee. The chairman is usually the leader of the united front system of the Chinese Communist Party (CCP), being the head of the principal forum for united front work.

Since its establishment, all CPPCC chairpersons have been a member of the Politburo Standing Committee of the CCP except during transition periods, being at least its 4th-ranking member. The incumbent chairman is Wang Huning, who is the 4th-ranking member of the PSC.

Roles 
The chairman is central to the united front system of the CCP. According to Sinologist Peter Mattis, the role "largely consists of public appearances, speaking engagements, and pressing the flesh to ensure the party’s ideas remain paramount". The chairman speaks at the department directors’ meeting of the United Front Work Department (UFWD) held around every December or January, with the Chinese state media emphasizing the role of the chairman and their speeches over the UFWD director, who nominally presides over the meeting. Additionally, though not required by law, the chairman also generally serves as the leader of the China Council for the Promotion of Peaceful National Reunification (CCPPNR), a united front organization.

List of officeholders 
Multiple terms in office, consecutive or otherwise, are listed and counted in the first column counts individuals and the second column (term number).

 Generations of leadership

Timeline

Further reading

References

 
1949 establishments in China